Gomilica (Prekmurje Slovene: Gomolice) is a village in the Municipality of Turnišče in the Prekmurje region of northeastern Slovenia.

An Eneolithic settlement was discovered near the village in 1981 by sensing. The habitation layer was between 45 and 70 cm deep and contained pot shards.

References

External links 
Gomilica on Geopedia

Populated places in the Municipality of Turnišče